Maria Candida of the Eucharist (16 January 1884 – 12 June 1949) - born Maria Barba - was an Italian Roman Catholic professed religious of the Discalced Carmelites. Barba desired to become a professed religious in her adolescence but her parents forbade this and she was forced to wait two decades for her to realize her dream; she entered the order after her parents died though alienated her brothers in the process who refused to ever see her due to their resentment towards her decision. Barba became a noted member of her convent in Ragusa and she served as prioress for an extensive period in which she fostered a rigid adherence to the order's rule so as to live the fullness of its charism. Her devotion to the Eucharist was a focal point for her spiritual thinking and her own life and she wrote to an extensive degree on the Eucharist and its importance. 

The beatification process opened on 15 October 1981 and she became titled as a Servant of God while she later became titled as Venerable on 18 December 2000 upon the confirmation of her life of heroic virtue. Pope John Paul II beatified Barba in Saint Peter's Square on 21 March 2004.

Life
Maria Barba was born on 16 January 1884 in Catanzaro as the tenth of twelve children (five who died in their childhoods) to the appellate court judge Pietro Barba and Giovanna Flora; she was baptized on the following 19 January. Her parents and siblings all hailed from Palermo but moved to Catanzaro while her father was in that town during a brief assignment. In 1886 the family returned to Palermo.

In 1891 she began her time at school and achieved excellent grades while there; she completed her studies in 1898. That same year she began to learn the piano.  On 3 April 1894 she made her First Communion and from that point on fostered a special devotion to the Eucharist and developed what she referred to as her "vocation for the Eucharist". Barba despaired at not being able to receive it on a frequent basis. In 1899 she felt a strong calling to the religious life as she reflected before an image of the Sacred Heart and would call this experience her "transformation" and the 2 July 1899 vesting of her cousin as a nun augmented this desire. The girl informed her parents of her decision but her parents opposed this, believing it nothing more than initial spiritual fervour rather than an actual desire. But Barba's devotion grew after learning about the charism of the Carmelites which inspired her more through reading the journal of Thérèse of Lisieux. This also encouraged her to persevere despite being rejected and she continued to wait for the time when she could achieve her dream.

Her father died on 21 June 1904. In September 1910 she and her mother and siblings undertook a pilgrimage to Rome and met Pope Pius X in an audience. The girl later made her Confirmation at a rather advanced age on 12 November 1912. Her mother died on 5 June 1914. Barba could not receive the Eucharist on a frequent basis as her brothers would not allow her to go out on her own so she complied so as not to offend them.

Barba waited for two decades before she could enter the order's convent at Ragusa on 25 September 1919 and the Cardinal Archbishop of Palermo Alessandro Lualdi encouraged her to enter and fulfil her desire to become a nun. Her entrance into the order saw her assume the religious name of "Maria Candida of the Eucharist" on 16 April 1920 after receiving the habit. Barba made her initial profession on 17 April 1921 and later made her perpetual profession on 23 April 1924. In 1924 her period of formation came to a close and she was elected as the prioress of the convent on 10 November; she held this position until 1947 and was reconfirmed in that position on five separate occasions. Barba worked hard with caution to revive the spirit of their foundress and under her able leadership the convent grew to a point where a new foundation could be made in Siracusa. The prioress also helped to secure the return of the friars of the order to the Sicilian region. Barba spent hours before the Eucharist. None of her brothers ever visited her having grown to resent her decision and did not even attend the celebration when she was first vested with the order's habit.

On 19 June 1933 - the feast of Corpus Christi - the nun began writing the book that served as a record of her own personal experiences and reflections on Eucharistic meditations and this was completed in 1936. The book also records deepening theological reflections on those personal experiences of hers. On 16 June 1922 she had starting writing "Up: First Steps" on her vocation and arrival to the order while later on 5 November 1926 beginning "Mountain Song" at the request of her confessor on her Carmelite life.

Barba was first diagnosed with a tumor in her liver back in 1947. She died of cancer on the evening of 12 June 1949 and her remains were interred at Ragusa the following 14 June.  Her remains were later relocated on 12 November 1970.

Beatification
The beatification process opened in Ragusa in an informative process that Bishop Francesco Pennisi oversaw from its inauguration on 5 March 1956 until its closure later on 28 June 1962; the formal introduction to the cause came on 15 October 1981 in which she became titled as a Servant of God. The Congregation for the Causes of Saints later validated the previous informative process in Rome on 31 May 1991 and received the Positio dossier from postulation officials in 1992. Theologians assented to the cause on 28 April 2000 as did the C.C.S. on 17 October 2000; the confirmation of her life of heroic virtue allowed for Pope John Paul II to name her as Venerable on 18 December 2000.

The process for a miracle needed for beatification was investigated in the place of its origin from 12 June 1986 until 9 December 1986 while the C.C.S. later validated the process on 26 March 1993 in Rome. Medical experts approved this healing to be a legitimate miracle on 23 May 2002 as did theologians on 13 December 2002 and the C.C.S. themselves on 4 March 2003. John Paul II approved this miracle on 12 April 2003 and later beatified Barba on 21 March 2004 in Saint Peter's Square. The second miracle - the one needed for sainthood - was investigated in the place of its origin from 29 June 2007 until 19 June 2008.

The current postulator for the cause is the Discalced Carmelite priest Romano Gambalunga.

Quotations
In her book she related devotions to the Blessed Mother to the Eucharist and wrote: "I want to be like Mary ... to be Mary for Jesus, to take the place of His Mother. When I receive Jesus in Communion, Mary is always present. I want to receive Jesus from her hands, she must make me one with Him. I cannot separate Mary from Jesus. Hail, O Body born of Mary. Hail Mary, dawn of the Eucharist!"

Among her other statements:
 O my Beloved Sacrament, I see You, I believe in You! O Holy Faith. Contemplate with ever-greater faith our Dear Lord in the Sacrament: live with Him who comes to us every day.
 O My Divine Eucharist, my dear Hope, all our hope is in You. Ever since I was a baby my hope in the Holy Eucharist has been strong.
 My Jesus, how I love You! There is within my heart an enormous love for You, O Sacramental Love. How great is the love of God made bread for our souls, who becomes a prisoner for me!

Publications
 Up: First Steps - 1922.
 Mountain Song - 1926.
 Eucharist: True Jewel of Eucharistic Spirituality - 1936.

See also
 Alexandrina of Balazar
 Concepción Cabrera de Armida

References

External links
Hagiography Circle
Santi e Beati

1884 births
1949 deaths
20th-century venerated Christians
20th-century Italian Roman Catholic religious sisters and nuns
20th-century Christian mystics
Beatifications by Pope John Paul II
Burials in Sicily
Carmelite beatified people
Carmelite mystics
Discalced Carmelite nuns
Venerated Carmelites
Italian beatified people
People from Catanzaro
Venerated Catholics by Pope John Paul II